ABM Elias was a Bangladesh Army brigadier general and Military Secretary to the President of Bangladesh. He later served as a diplomat being the military attaché of Bangladesh to Turkey.

Career
Elias was commission in the 35th batch of Pakistan Military Academy. He was the founding commander of the 33rd Artillery Brigade which is based in Comilla Cantonment. He served as the chair of a military tribunal following the military coup of General Hussain Mohammad Ershad.

From 1984 to 1989, Elias served as the Military Secretary to the President of Bangladesh, Hussain Mohammad Ershad. He then served as the military attaché in the Bangladesh Embassy in Turkey.

Death
Elias died on 1 August 2015.

References

Bangladesh Army generals
2015 deaths